
Tshe (or Tje) (Ћ ћ; italics: Ћ ћ) is a letter of the Cyrillic script, used only in the Serbian Cyrillic alphabet, where it represents the voiceless alveolo-palatal affricate , somewhat like the pronunciation of  in "chew"; however, it must not  be confused with the voiceless retroflex affricate Che (Ч ч), which represents  and which also exists in Serbian Cyrillic script. The sound of Tshe is produced from the voiceless alveolar plosive  by iotation. Tshe is the 23rd letter in the Serbian alphabet. It was first used by Dositej Obradović as a revival of the old Cyrillic letter Djerv (Ꙉ), and was later adopted in the 1818 Serbian dictionary of Vuk Stefanović Karadžić. The equivalent character to Tshe in Gaj's Latin alphabet is Ć.

Despite being a Cyrillic letter, Tshe was also used in Latin-based Slovincian phonetic transcriptions with the same value as in Serbian.

Being part of the most common Serbian last names, the transliteration of Tshe to the Latin alphabet is very important; however, there are many ways to transliterate it. It looks similar to the Shha (Һ һ) but stroked.

As it is one of the letters unique to the Serbian Cyrillic alphabet, and also the first letter of the Serbian word for Cyrillic, Tshe is often used as the basis for logos for various groups involved with the Cyrillic alphabet.

Related letters and other similar characters
Т т : Cyrillic letter Te
Ч ч : Cyrillic letter Che
Ђ ђ : Cyrillic letter Dje
Һ һ : Cyrillic letter Shha
Ќ, ќ : Cyrillic letter Kje
Ć ć : Latin letter C with acute
Ħ ħ : Latin letter H with stroke

Computing codes

References

External links

South Slavic languages
Serbian letters